This is a list of commemorative postage stamps issued by the India Post between 1947 and 1950.

1947

1948

1949

1950

References

External links
 Catalogue of Indian Postage Stamps

Postage stamps of India
India